Florida Amendment 2 may refer to

 2008 Florida Amendment 2
 2014 Florida Amendment 2
 2016 Florida Amendment 2
 2020 Florida Amendment 2